United Pursuit (also known as, United Pursuit Band) is an American contemporary worship music band founded in 2006 from Knoxville, Tennessee. They have released three live albums, EP in 2008, Radiance in 2009, and Simple Gospel in 2015. The 2015 album was their breakthrough release upon the Billboard charts.

Background 
The band has its origins in a 2006 house purchase in the 5th Avenue section of downtown Knoxville, Tennessee, where they hoped to attract believers and people for Jesus Christ. They started with the indie folk rock  worship music back in 2008. Their members are Michael Ketterer, Will Reagan, Brock Human, Nathan Fray, Jake LeBoeuf, Brandon Hampton, Andrea Marie Reagan, John Romero, and Yoosung Lee.

Music history 
The band started music recording in 2008, with their first live album, EP, that was released on May 31, 2008, from United Pursuit Records. Their subsequent live album, Radiance, was released on March 31, 2009, by United Pursuit Records. They released, Simple Gospel, on August 14, 2015, with United Pursuit Records. This album would be the breakthrough released upon the Billboard magazine charts, where it peaked at No. 85 on The Billboard 200, No. 2 on Christian Albums, and No. 6 on Independent Albums. This album was No. 13. on the Worship Leader'''s Top 20 Albums of 2015 list.

 Members 
Current members
 Will Reagan – vocals, acoustic guitar, keys
 Brock Human – vocals, acoustic guitar
 Brandon Hampton – vocals, electric guitar
 Andrea Marie Reagan – vocals, piano
 Michael Ketterer – vocals
 Jake LeBoeuf – vocals
 John Romero – bass
 Yoosung Lee – cello
 Nathan Fray – drums

 Discography 
 EP (June 1, 2008)
 Radiance (April 21, 2009)
 In the Night Season (August 18, 2009)
 Live at the Banks House (November 11, 2009)
 Love/War/Solar System (July 26, 2011)
 Color Of Red (November 8, 2011)
 Here Begin (December 10, 2011)
 Endless Years (December 4, 2012)
 Live At the Banks House (September 17, 2013)
 The Wild Inside (February 11, 2014)
 Simple Gospel (August 14, 2015)
 Looking for a Savior (August 26, 2016)
 Simple Gospel B-Sides (December 23, 2016)
 Tell All My Friends (January 20, 2017)
 40. (August 15, 2017)
 Letting Go (December 11, 2017)
 The Monthly EP (February 18, 2018)
 Garden (June 22, 2018)
 Garden (Live)'' (November 30, 2018)

References

External links 
Official website

Musical groups from Tennessee
2006 establishments in Tennessee
Musical groups established in 2006